Boris Néstor Martínez Salazar was a Panamanian military officer of the former National Guard. He spearheaded the 1968 Panamanian coup d'état, which overthrew president-elect Arnulfo Arias Madrid, who had only been in office for eleven days.

A few months after the coup, on 23 February 1969, he was exiled to the United States by Omar Torrijos. He settled in Miami and worked for an aviation company.

References

Panamanian military commanders
Panamanian expatriates in the United States
Year of birth missing
Possibly living people